Trevor Amann (born May 3, 1998) is an American soccer player who currently plays for Northern Colorado Hailstorm in USL League One.

Career

Youth 
Amann attended Shattuck-St. Mary's School in Faribault, Minnesota, where he scored 16 goals over the final two prep campaigns, earning team Offensive MVP honors, a second-team all-conference mention in each of his freshman and sophomore seasons.

College & Amateur
In 2016, Amann attended Colorado School of Mines to play college soccer. In two seasons with the Orediggers, Amann made 39 appearances, scoring 21 goals and tallying seven assists. In his freshman season he was a Blaster Award winner as Mines Athletics' top male rookie, earned D2CCA Second-Team All-Region, RMAC Freshman of the Year, and First-Team All-RMAC. His sophomore season saw Amann named United Soccer Coaches Second-Team All-Region, and named First-Team All-RMAC for a second consecutive season.

Amann transferred to Midwestern State University in 2017, where he continued his scoring, netting 28 goals in 51 appearances with the Mustangs. He twice won All-Lone Star Conference, LSC Player of the Year, and LSC Forward of the Year. In his senior year he was named D2CCA All-American, United Soccer Coaches All-Region, United Soccer Coaches All-American, D2CCA All-Region, and D2CCA South Central Region Player of the Year.

While at college, Amann also played in the NPSL. In 2018, he made eight regular season appearances for Detroit City, scoring five goals, finishing as Detroit's leading scorer. In 2021, he played with Denton Diablos, scoring six goals in seven regular season games, before scoring a further 11 goals in the playoffs. Amann was named NPSL National Championship Man of the Match in the 2021 NPSL National Championship game, where Denton beat Tulsa Athletic 5–2 to become champions.

Professional 
On January 4, 2022, Amann signed his first professional contract with USL League One club Northern Colorado Hailstorm ahead of their inaugural season. He made his professional debut on April 6, 2022, appearing as a substitute during an extra-time win in the Lamar Hunt U.S. Open Cup over Colorado Springs Switchbacks.

Honors

Club
Denton Diablos
NPSL: 2021 (Champions)

References

External links 
 Mines profile
 MSU Texas profile

1998 births
Living people
American soccer players
Association football forwards
Colorado Mines Orediggers men's soccer players
Detroit City FC players
Midwestern State Mustangs men's soccer players
National Premier Soccer League players
Northern Colorado Hailstorm FC players
People from Westminster, Colorado
Soccer players from Colorado